Dani Howard (born 1993) is a British composer originally from Hong Kong, where she attended the South Island School.

She attended the Royal College of Music between 2011 and 2015, where she studied composition with Jonathan Cole as a Rose Williams Scholar.

Since graduating, she has worked with orchestras including the Royal Liverpool Philharmonic Orchestra, City Chamber Orchestra of Hong Kong, Southbank Sinfonia, Orchestra Vitae, and Bloomington Symphony Orchestra. Most recently she has been one of the composers-in-residence at the International Suoni Dal Golfo Festival of Music and Poetry.

In 2017, she was selected by ClassicFM to write a new work celebrating the 25th anniversary of the classical music radio station. Written for orchestra, her piece 'Argentum' was premiered by the Royal Liverpool Philharmonic Orchestra at the Royal Albert Hall in September 2017.

She was a finalist in the 2014 and 2015 editions of the International Antonín Dvořák Composition Competition, held in Prague. In both years, she won the Junior 3rd Special Prize for the best free composition in the junior category

Her works have been released on NonClassical, Listenpony and TYXart record labels, and broadcast on BBC Radio 3, BBC 4, ClassicFM and RTHK.

List of works

Orchestral/large ensemble 
 Trombone Concerto - Trombone and orchestra (ww: 2122, brass: 3221, perc: 2 + timp+hp, strings)
 Ellipsis - Symphony Orchestra (ww: 3333, Brass: 4331, perc: 4 + timp, 2 harp, celeste, strings)
 Coalescence – Symphony Orchestra (ww: 3333, brass: 4331, perc: 4+timp+hp, strings)
 Argentum - Symphony Orchestra (ww: 3333, brass: 4331, perc: 3+timp, harp, strings)
 Arches - Symphony Orchestra (ww: 2233, brass: 4331, perc: 4+timp+harp, strings)
 Gates of Spring – Symphony Orchestra (ww: 2222, brass: 4231, perc: 5+timp+harp, strings)
 MIA TErra - Symphony Orchestra and Chorus (ww: 3333, brass: 4331, perc: 4+timp, harp, strings, SATB chorus)
 Verticality - Chamber Orchestra (ww: 3230, brass: 1210 (optional 2110), perc: 4+timp, piano, strings)
 Silver Falls - String Orchestra
 Heroes – Chamber Orchestra and Childrens Choir (ww: 2222, brass: 2200 perc: 2, strings)
 Fanfare - Brass Ensemble (brass: 4441)
 Jigsaw – For mixed-ability symphony orchestra and electronics - 2 difficulty level in all parts including: ww + sx, bs, strings, hp, pno & perc
 Blinded by the Light – String orchestra and Youth Brass (strings: 4321 brass: 2210 minimum) – can include as many players as available
 Introspection for 24 Percussionists
 Robin Hood – Opera (90 minutes) – (five singers, 10 piece ensemble)

Chamber music 
 Neverland – Saxophone Quartet 
 Ostara - Piano, Cello & Clarinet
 Ascending to Serenity - Piano Violin & Bass Clarinet
 What Lies Beneath Rings - Percussion Octet
 Blue Pavilion - Brass Quintet
 Strings - Trumpet, Trombone & Percussion
 Sieve - Percussion Quartet and Baritone
 Remonte - Percussion Quartet
 Unbound – Vocal Octet (SSAATTBB)
 The Den – Cello, Guitar & Flute

Solo/duo 
 Dualism – Violin and Piano
 The Earl of St. Vincent - Solo Piano
 Mind Games - Solo Percussion
 Two-and-a-half Minutes to Midnight - Solo Soprano Recorder
 Two-and-a-half Minutes to Midnight - arr. Solo Piccolo
 Parallel Lines - Trombone and Percussion
 Symmetry - Violin Duo
 Momentums - Solo Tuba and Tape
 DragonSnap! – Clarinet Duet
 Chrysalis - Piano and Cello
 Lacuna - Solo Piano (for beginners)
 Shades - Solo Percussion and loop pedal
 Revs – for solo timpani (ABRSM Grade 5 syllabus)

The Vino Encores:
A series of encores for solo instrument and wineglass

 An Encore for Clarinet and Wine (1″25)
 An Encore for Trumpet and Wine (2″00)
 An Encore for Bassoon and Wine (1″45)
 An Encore for Oboe and Wine (2″30)

References

External links 

 
 Published works

1993 births
Living people
British classical composers
20th-century classical composers
Women classical composers
English composers
Women opera composers
English opera composers
20th-century British composers
20th-century English women musicians
British women composers
Alumni of the Royal College of Music
21st-century English women musicians
20th-century women composers